Huang Xintong (born January 26, 1987) is a Chinese former competitive ice dancer. With partner Zheng Xun, she is the 2011 Asian Winter Games champion and a five-time Chinese national champion (2007, 2009, 2011, 2012, and 2014). Their best result at the World Championships was 12th in 2012.

Programs

Competitive highlights
(with Zheng)

References

External links

 

1987 births
Living people
Chinese female ice dancers
Figure skaters at the 2007 Winter Universiade
Figure skaters at the 2010 Winter Olympics
Figure skaters at the 2014 Winter Olympics
Olympic figure skaters of China
Figure skaters from Harbin
Asian Games medalists in figure skating
Figure skaters at the 2007 Asian Winter Games
Figure skaters at the 2011 Asian Winter Games
Medalists at the 2007 Asian Winter Games
Medalists at the 2011 Asian Winter Games
Asian Games gold medalists for China
Asian Games silver medalists for China
Competitors at the 2009 Winter Universiade